The American Collection was a spinoff series of Masterpiece Theater, which ran from 2000 to 2003, for the former series' 30th anniversary. It was funded originally by Exxon Mobil (later Mobil); however, funding for both series was withdrawn in 2005. It aired on PBS. This was a widely acclaimed limited run program.

History
This program featured film adaptations by renowned works by American literary giants, and debuted in October 2000. The films are produced by WGBH and ALT films.

Theme music
The theme for this series was created by John Williams, and featured cellist Yo-Yo Ma. It can be listened to here: https://www.pbs.org/wgbh/masterpiece/americancollection/music.html

Title design
Karin Fong, Dana Yee and Grant Lau won a 2001 Primetime Emmy Award for Outstanding Main Title Design for their work on this series.

Programs
 Thornton Wilder's Our Town
 Esmeralda Santiago's Almost a Woman
 James Agee's A Death in the Family
 Eudora Welty's The Ponder Heart
 Willa Cather's The Song of the Lark
 Henry James's The American
 Langston Hughes's Cora Unashamed (a short story from his 1934 collection The Ways of White Folks)

References

External links
 
 National Council of Teachers of English's American Collection site

2000 American television series debuts
2003 American television series endings
PBS original programming
Television series by WGBH